Foxburrow is a townland in County Westmeath, Ireland.

Foxburrow is one of 11 townlands of the civil parish of Taghmon in the barony of Corkaree in the Province of Leinster.

The neighbouring townlands are: Taghmon to the north and east and Glebe to the south.

References

External links
Map of Foxburrow at openstreetmap.org
Foxburrow at the IreAtlas Townland Data Base
Foxburrow at Townlands.ie
Foxburrow at The Placenames Database of Ireland

Townlands of County Westmeath